Bulakbashi, or Buloqboshi, may refer to:

Bulakbashi, Kyrgyzstan
Bulakbashy, Uzbekistan, a town in the Andijan region of Uzbekistan
Buloqboshi District, a raion in Uzbekistan